Aleksandar Marinković  (Serbian Cyrillic: Александар Маринковић; born July 13, 1990) is a Serbian goalkeeper.

Club career

Zemun
He made two appearances for team in the 2010–11 Serbian First League season.

Rad
He made his professional debut for Rad on 1 October 2011, in Serbian SuperLiga match versus Hajduk Kula.

BASK
He played 14 matches for BASK in the Serbian League Belgrade, where he was loaned from FK Rad.

References

External links
 

Association football goalkeepers
Serbian footballers
Serbian SuperLiga players
FK Zemun players
FK Rad players
FK BASK players
FK BSK Borča players
Serbian expatriate footballers
Expatriate footballers in Portugal
C.D. Nacional players
1990 births
Living people
Sportspeople from Kragujevac
Expatriate footballers in Mongolia